This is a list of transactions that have taken place during the 2020 NBL off-season and the 2020–21 NBL season.

Retirements

Front office movements

Coaching changes

Player movements

Retained players/Contract extensions

Released players

Free agency 
Free agency negotiations were initially delayed until at least 1 May 2020, after the NBL and the Australian Basketball Players' Association postponed the original start date of 30 March 2020 due to the COVID-19 pandemic. On 1 May 2020 the start of free agency was further delayed to 1 July 2020, and on 26 June 2020 it was delayed again to 15 July 2020.

Next Star signings 
The NBL Next Stars Program is designed to provide young elite overseas players, mainly Americans, with a professional option immediately out of secondary school. Each team receives one additional import roster slot intended to provide a "Next Star" slot.

Departing the league

Players who opted out 
On 18 April 2020, due to the COVID-19 pandemic the NBL signed an agreement with the Australian Basketball Players' Association which implemented salary cuts designed to protect the league during the pandemic. In this agreement, players were allowed to opt out of their current contracts across a two-week period following the agreement's implementation. However, players were able to opt back into their previous contracts or re-sign with their previous club but couldn't sign with a new NBL club until their contract expired.

Other players who left the league

Rosters

Adelaide 36ers

Brisbane Bullets

Cairns Taipans

Illawarra Hawks

Melbourne United

New Zealand Breakers

Perth Wildcats

South East Melbourne Phoenix

Sydney Kings

See also 

 2020–21 NBL season
 National Basketball League (Australia)

References 

2020–21 NBL season
2020